Aristocapsa is a genus of plants in the family Polygonaceae with a single species, Aristocapsa insignis, restricted to California. It is known by the common names Indian Valley spineflower or Indian Valley spinecape, and it is endemic to the inland southern Coast Ranges of Monterey and San Luis Obispo Counties.

References

External links
 Jepson Manual Treatment
 USDA Plants Profile

Monotypic Polygonaceae genera
Flora of California